Rice Township is one of the twelve townships of Sandusky County, Ohio, United States.  As of the 2000 census, 1,437 people lived in the township.

Geography

Located in the northern part of the county along Sandusky Bay, it borders the following townships:
Salem Township, Ottawa County - north
Bay Township, Ottawa County - northeast, across Sandusky Bay
Riley Township - southeast
Sandusky Township - south
Washington Township - west
Harris Township, Ottawa County - northwest corner

No municipalities are located in Rice Township, but it does contain the unincorporated community of Kingsway.

Name and history
Rice Township was established in 1840. It was named for Judge Ezekiel Rice, a pioneer settler.

It is the only Rice Township statewide.

Government

The township is governed by a three-member board of trustees, who are elected in November of odd-numbered years to a four-year term beginning on the following January 1. Two are elected in the year after the presidential election and one is elected in the year before it. There is also an elected township fiscal officer, who serves a four-year term beginning on April 1 of the year after the election, which is held in November of the year before the presidential election. Vacancies in the fiscal officership or on the board of trustees are filled by the remaining trustees.

References

External links
County website

Townships in Sandusky County, Ohio
Townships in Ohio